The Club de Periodistas de Mexico (Mexican Press Club) is an association of journalists in Mexico. Since 1952 the Club organises annual awards for journalists, with recipients including Carmen Aristegui.

References

External links
 Official Website

Mexican journalism organizations
Press clubs